The EF 35-80mm 4-5.6 USM lens is a family of EF mount wide-to-normal zoom lenses manufactured and sold by Canon. There were five versions made. One contained a peizoelectric motor, three contained a micro motor, and one contained a USM motor.

Specifications

References

External links

Canon EF lenses